The Graphiolaceae are a family of fungi in the Basidiomycota, Exobasidiales order. Species in the family have a widespread distribution, especially in warm temperate and tropical areas. Members of the Graphiolaceae are plant pathogens that grow biotrophically on the leaves of plants in the Palmae family.

References

Ustilaginomycotina
Fungal plant pathogens and diseases
Basidiomycota families